Mazariegos is a municipality located in the province of Palencia, Castile and León, Spain.

Mazariegos and de Mazariegos may also refer to:

Mazariegos
Fernando Mazariegos (1938–2018), Guatemalan inventor of the drinking water filter "Ecofilter"
Pedro Molina Mazariegos (1777–1854), Central American politician, considered one of the founders of liberalism in Guatemala
Rocael Mazariegos (born 1966), Guatemalan footballer
Silvia Carolina Mazariegos (born 1961), Guatemalan Woman International Master in chess

de Mazariegos
Diego de Mazariegos (died 1536), Spanish conquistador
Diego de Mazariegos Guadalfajara (16th century), colonial governor of Cuba and of Venezuela Province